Albert Smith (22 June 1805 – 28 August 1870) was an American politician, a judge, and a U.S. Representative from New York.

Early live
Born in Cooperstown, New York, Smith completed preparatory studies and moved to Batavia, New York, where he studied law.  He was admitted to the bar and practiced law in Batavia.

Career
Smith held several local offices and served as member of the New York State Assembly in 1840.

Elected as a Whig to the Twenty-eighth and Twenty-ninth Congresses, Smith served as United States Representative for the 33rd district of New York from (4 March 1843 – 3 March 1847).

Smith moved to Milwaukee, Wisconsin in 1849, where he resumed the practice of law.  He was a Justice of the Peace 1851-1859 and served as judge of the Milwaukee County Court 1859-1870.

Death
Smith died in Milwaukee, Wisconsin, August 28, 1870 (age 65 years, 66 days).  He is interred at Forest Home Cemetery.

References

External links

 
 https://madison.newspaperarchive.com/madison-wisconsin-state-journal/1870-08-30/

1805 births
1870 deaths
People from Cooperstown, New York
New York (state) lawyers
Wisconsin lawyers
Wisconsin state court judges
Members of the New York State Assembly
Whig Party members of the United States House of Representatives from New York (state)
19th-century American politicians
19th-century American judges
19th-century American lawyers